Yasukawa is a Japanese surname. Notable people with the surname include:

, Japanese professional wrestler
Roger Yasukawa (born 1977), American auto racing driver
, Japanese diplomat
, Japanese football player

Japanese-language surnames